Abriès (Vivaro-Alpine: Abrièrs) is a former commune in the Hautes-Alpes department in southeastern France. On 1 January 2019, it was merged into the new commune of Abriès-Ristolas.

It belongs to the Queyras Regional Park. It is located in the valley of the Guil and is appreciated for its position along long and medium distance footpaths in a rural and preserved environment. It also hosts a small ski resort.

Geography
The elevation of Abriès is between 1,513 and 3,305 meters, and before the second half of the 20th century, it was difficult to access because of its location in the end of the Guil valley. It has always has been a path between Italy and the southern Alps in France.

Population

See also
Communes of the Hautes-Alpes department

References

See also 
 Bric Froid

Former communes of Hautes-Alpes
Populated places disestablished in 2019
Dauphiné